Vinculinula is a genus of moths of the Bombycidae family.

Species
 Vinculinula attacoides Walker, 1862
 Vinculinula diehli Dierl, 1978

References

 

Bombycidae